Rülzheim is a Verbandsgemeinde ("collective municipality") in the district of Germersheim, Rhineland-Palatinate, Germany. The seat of the Verbandsgemeinde is in Rülzheim.

The Verbandsgemeinde Rülzheim consists of the following Ortsgemeinden ("local municipalities"):

 Hördt
 Kuhardt
 Leimersheim
 Rülzheim

Verbandsgemeinde in Rhineland-Palatinate